Gary Mark Pick (born 9 July 1971) is an English former professional footballer who played in the Football League for Cambridge United and Hereford United.

Career
Pick was born in Leicester and began his career with Stoke City having joined from non-league Leicester United. He failed to break into the first team at Stoke and joined Third Division side Hereford United in 1994 where he made 56 appearances over two season at Edgar Street. He went on to play Cambridge United and non-league sides Newport County, Kettering Town and Worcester City.

Career statistics
Source:

References

1971 births
Living people
English footballers
Association football midfielders
English Football League players
Stoke City F.C. players
Leicester United F.C. players
Hereford United F.C. players
Cambridge United F.C. players
Newport County A.F.C. players
Kettering Town F.C. players
Worcester City F.C. players